Tracy Hutson is an American reality television personality and one of the original style consultants on ABC TV's television series Extreme Makeover: Home Edition. Hutson grew up in Dallas, Texas.

Acting career
Hutson has appeared in a number of national television commercials, as well as sitcoms including Damaged Goods and Less Than Perfect.

Her film roles include the 1997 independent film Mixed Signals, the 2000 independent film Endsville, and the May 2000 TV movie Rated X, starring Charlie Sheen and Emilio Estevez, in which she portrayed adult film star Marilyn Chambers.

Design career
Hutson began a career as a stylist and designer in 1999, when she started her own design business in Los Angeles.

In 2003, Hutson joined ABC TV's Extreme Makeover: Home Edition as a style consultant. She remained a crewmember until the show ended in 2012.

In 2011, Hutson and fellow Extreme Makeover personality Tanya McQueen debuted the show Picker Sisters on Lifetime. The show follows Hutson and McQueen as they travel around the United States in search of antiques and rare collectibles for their home decor store in Los Angeles.

Along with The Design Network, Hutson helps "deserving moms" with their interior design in the video series Momtourage.

Personal life 
In December 2003, Hutson was reunited with high school classmate, actor Barry Watson, whom she had briefly dated during their twenties.  The two married and had two children. Their first son, Oliver, was born on May 2, 2005, and their second son, Felix, was born on November 13, 2007. They separated in 2011.

References

External links
 

Living people
20th-century American actresses
21st-century American actresses
American film actresses
American interior designers
Actresses from Dallas
People from Richardson, Texas
American television actresses
American women interior designers
Place of birth missing (living people)
Year of birth missing (living people)
Television personalities from Texas